Rubus palmeri is a rare Mexican species of brambles in the rose family. It has been found only in the Sierra Madre Occidental in Chihuahua, Durango, Jalisco, Nayarit, and Sonora in western Mexico.

Rubus palmeri is a reclining perennial with stems up to 4 meters (13.3 feet) long, reclining on walls, rocks, or other vegetation. Stems are covered with wool and armed with curved prickles. Leaves are pinnately compound with 3 or 5 leaflets. Flowers are white. Fruits are dark purple.

References

External links
photo of herbarium specimen at Missouri Botanical Garden collected in Durango in 1906

palmeri
Flora of Mexico
Plants described in 1913